Charles Frederick "Carl" Voegelin (January 14, 1906 – May 22, 1986), often cited as C. F. Voegelin, was an American linguist and anthropologist. He was one of the leading authorities on Indigenous languages of North America, specifically the Algonquian  and Uto-Aztecan languages.  He published many influential works on Delaware,  Shawnee, Hopi and the Tübatulabal languages.

Early life and education 
Voegelin was born in New York on January 14, 1906, and christened Charles Frederick Voegelin, but he became known as Carl.

He entered Stanford University and earned a BA in Psychology, after which he traveled to New Zealand to study Maori music. Then he decided to study anthropology at University of California, Berkeley where he was trained by Alfred Kroeber, Robert Lowie and Melville Jacobs, writing his dissertation as a grammar of Tübatulabal. At first he had great difficulties hearing the phonetic distinctions of the language, but in 1931 he went to the field with Danish linguist Hans Jørgen Uldall who taught him to recognize all the phonetic contrasts. His proficiency in Indigenous languages became so good that he was able to correspond with Leonard Bloomfield in Ojibwe, letters later published in the journal Anthropological Linguistics.

Career
Vogelin went on to do postdoctoral work in linguistics at Yale University with Edward Sapir, and then he taught at DePauw University, before joining Indiana University Bloomington in 1941 as that university's first professor of anthropology. During his tenure at Indiana he managed the United States' largest Army Specialized Training Program in foreign languages. In 1944, he persuaded Indiana University to host the International Journal of American Linguistics (IJAL), which had stopped being published in 1939, shortly before the death of its first editor Franz Boas. Voegelin served as editor of IJAL for many years.

Among his graduate students at Indiana were Ken Hale and Dell Hymes. Later he held an appointment at the University of Hawai'i, before returning to Indiana as an emeritus professor.

Personal life 
Voegelin was first married to ethnologist Erminie Wheeler-Voegelin, with whom he conducted fieldwork.  Later he married linguist Florence M. Voegelin, an accomplished linguist in her own right. Together they co-authored numerous publications.

He died on May 22, 1986.

Honors 
In 1947 Voegelin was Guggenheim Fellow at Indiana University Bloomington's Department of Anthropology.

He became a fellow of the American Academy of Arts and Sciences in 1951.

He was president of the Linguistic Society of America in 1954.

In 1975, several of Voegelin's colleagues and former students collaborated on the festschrift Linguistics and Anthropology: In Honor of C. F. Voegelin.

In 1983 he was awarded an Honorary Doctorate (Doctor of Humane Letters) by the University of Indiana at Bloomington, as well as a Distinguished Service Award of the American Anthropological Association.

Voegelin's collected papers are held by the American Philosophical Society.

Selected publications

 Map of North American Indian Languages. American Ethnological Society. 1941. With Florence M. Voegelin. 
Shawnee Phonemes. Language 11: 23-37. 1935.
 , in: 
Shawnee Stems and the Jacob P. Dunn Miami Dictionary. Indiana Historical Society Prehistory Research Series 1: 63-108, 135-167, 289-323, 345-406, 409-478, 1938–1940.
Hopi domains: A lexical approach to the problem of selection. Indiana University Publications in Anthropology and Linguistics: Memoir 14. With Florence M. Voegelin. 1957. 
1959. Guide to transcribing unwritten languages in field work. Anthropological Linguistics 1:1-28. With Florence M. Voegelin. 1962. 
Typological and Comparative Grammar of Uto-Aztecan; I, Phonology. IJAL Memoir no. 17. With Florence M. Voegelin and Ken Hale. 1962. 
 Typological and comparative grammar of Uto-Aztecan. IJAL 28(1):210-213. With Florence M. Voegelin. 

 Passive transformations form non-transitive bases in Hopi. IJAL 33:276-281. With Florence M. Voegelin. 1967.
Classification and index of the world's languages. (Foundations of Linguistics series). New York: Elsevier. With Florence M. Voegelin. 1977.

References

Linguists from the United States
1906 births
1986 deaths
Linguists of Siouan languages
Linguists of Iroquoian languages
Linguists of Uto-Aztecan languages
Linguists of Algic languages
Linguistic Society of America presidents
20th-century linguists
Fellows of the American Academy of Arts and Sciences